The Pasig River Expressway (PAREX) is a proposed elevated expressway in Metro Manila, Philippines that will skirt the banks of the Pasig River and connect the cities of Manila, Mandaluyong, Makati, Pasig, Taguig and the municipality of Taytay. The expressway is being proposed to alleviate east-west traffic congestion in Metro Manila. It is a joint venture between the Philippine National Construction Corporation and the San Miguel Corporation. The project broke ground on September 24, 2021, while construction of the expressway has yet to start pending the approval of its Environmental Compliance Certificate (ECC).

Route description
The expressway will start from Radial Road 10 in Manila and will end at Southeast Metro Manila Expressway in the municipality of Taytay. There will be three segments, in addition to utilizing the portion of the Skyway Stage 3 from Plaza Azul (Nagtahan) to San Juan River in Manila.

From Manila at the west, the expressway will run along the southern bank of Pasig River. It would turn to the land in Paco, where it will utilize the right-of-way of Paz Mendoza-Guazon Street and Quirino Avenue before meeting Skyway Stage 3's Nagtahan Exit at Plaza Azul. Its utilization of Skyway's segment starts at Plaza Dilao Exit and ends at the future San Juan Intersection with Skyway Stage 3 above San Juan River. From there, it would resume and cuts through Punta, Santa Ana, Manila before retaking the Pasig River alignment at the southern bank up to the future Southeast Metro Manila Expressway/C-6 in Taytay, Rizal.

History
First proposed circa 2017 as the Manila–Taguig Expressway (MTEX), a project of Citra Group and PT Citra Persada Infrastruktur, the expressway is planned as a viaduct over the Pasig River and Laguna de Bay, and a network of bridges similar to the proposed Metro Manila Skybridge. The expressway will have three segments and two- to six-lane viaducts and bridges. The overall length of the expressway will be . The expressway is also said to undertake river dredging and cleanup works on the Pasig River before, during, and after construction.

In September 2021, the San Miguel Corporation has named Filipino green architect Felino "Jun" Palafox as a prospective consultant to introduce "green architectural and urban features" in the Pasig River Expressway system. Initially denying his involvement, Palafox later confirmed his involvement in the project, emphasizing the need for a "missing link for the eastern and western parts of Metro Manila”.

The project's technical aspects and financial aspects were approved by the Toll Regulatory Board on July 14, and a public scoping was held by the Department of Environment and Natural Resources (DENR) the same day. The project scoping report indicated that 101 representatives were present at the scoping, most of which had raised concerns on the project's environmental impacts and a lack of information on the project's detailed engineering designs. The report stated that each of these concerns were responded to with a promise for a follow-up public scoping to take place in October 2021.

On September 21, 2021, the Supplemental Toll Operations Agreement (STOA) was approved by the government, wherein a formal agreement was signed between the San Miguel Corporation, the Department of Transportation, and the Department of Public Works and Highways at a groundbreaking ceremony held on September 24, 2021.

On March 14, 2022, the STOA was approved by the Office of the President. A follow-up project scoping for the project was later held on March 25, 2022.

Construction of the expressway was expected to begin in 2022 and was to be complete by 2023, pending the signature of President Bongbong Marcos to start construction. However, as of 2023, construction has not yet begun, pending regulatory requirements.

Criticism and concerns

Environmental and mobility concerns 
Transport and environmental advocates in April and July 2021 opposed the project, citing environmental concerns that the concrete megastructure would hamper the river's role in controlling floods and contribute to the Urban Heat Island effect, which will worsen the urban heat in Metro Manila.

Concerns were raised that building the Pasig River Expressway would also introduce air and noise pollution in the area, as well as non-exhaust emissions, such as microplastics from car tires, road dust, and particulate matter that will worsen the pollution in the Pasig River and in the communities around it. Advocates also pointed out that the construction of more new roads would only worsen traffic congestion by attracting more vehicle use, thus decreasing mobility in a phenomenon known as induced demand.

Among the figures that opposed the expressway's construction is Senator Manny Pacquiao, who envisioned to develop the sides of the Pasig River into a tourist spot if elected as President in the 2022 Philippine presidential elections. Labor lawyer Luke Espiritu and environmentalist David D'Angelo, both under the senatorial slate of Partido Lakas ng Masa, have also called for the rejection of the project.

Heritage concerns 
The Intramuros Administration and heritage advocates also opposed the project, noting that the alignment of the project, particularly Segment 1 from Radial Road 10 to Plaza Azul, would transverse multiple heritage sites and historical buildings such as the Intramuros fortifications, Fort Santiago, the Aduana Building, the Bureau of Immigrations building, the National Press Club building, and the Manila Central Post Office. Both parties raised concerns on the proximity of the project to these heritage sites, as advocates noted that the project would not only disrupt the visual integrity of these heritage sites, but also as the vibrations during the construction of the project could also damage the structural integrity of these landmarks.

Issues during public scoping 
Mobility advocates have urged the DENR to postpone the second public scoping that was held on March 25, 2022, citing concerns that the first project scoping held last July 14, 2021 was not carried out correctly and should be invalidated, noting several inaccuracies and deficiencies in the project briefing materials. Advocates also noted the absence of key agencies such as the National Commission for Culture and the Arts, the National Historical Commission of the Philippines, the Department of Tourism, the Department of Science and Technology, and the Philippine Institute of Volcanology and Seismology at the previous public scoping, declaring the need to hold a new public scoping meeting that will include the inputs of the mentioned agencies. In April 2022, the Intramuros Administration has also informed the Environmental Management Bureau under the DENR that it has not been consulted about the project prior to the public hearing.

Discrepancies between the project alignment that was shown during the project scoping and on the environmental impact assessment (EIA) report were also raised, as 20 percent of the total alignment shown during the first project scoping has been modified in the EIA report. Advocates raised that these changes were not properly notified and informed to stakeholders along these areas, noting that the informed consent of these stakeholders are missing from the EIA report.

Environmental impact assessment plagiarism 
In April 2022, it was found out that the EIA report for the project contained entire sections that were plagiarized from the environmental impact assessments of the Makati Intra-city Subway in 2019 and a coal-fired power station expansion project in Misamis Oriental in 2017, and the project components section of the Cavite–Laguna Expressway. In response, advocates have petitioned the Environmental Management Bureau to investigate RHR Consulting Services, the company responsible for the preparation of the report, for any findings of misconduct and irregular practice present in the drafting of the EIA report.

Response 
The issues with the expressway were responded to by San Miguel Corporation President Ramon Ang, who emphasized the fact that the project would be at no cost to the government, dispelled misinformation suggesting that the expressway would cover the whole Pasig River instead of being built along it, and mentioned parallel plans to rehabilitate the river by widening and dredging the river at certain points. In response to concerns of induced demand, Ang responded that the project would not be exclusive to private car owners as it would also have a bus rapid transit system, bike lanes, and pedestrian infrastructure

Advocates indicated, however, that whether or not the project would be built along or above the river is irrelevant as the project itself would be inviting air pollution into a corridor that previously did not have any. Mobility advocates also questioned Ang's mention of including a bus rapid transit system, bike lanes, and pedestrian infrastructure in response to criticism as these features were not mentioned in detail in the project's EIA report. Environmental architect Paulo Alcazaren also weighed in that the elevated nature of the proposed bus rapid transit system, bike lanes, and pedestrian infrastructure would pose accessibility and connectivity issues.

The project's "unusually fast" approval process was also criticized given the approval of the STOA despite the lack of an environmental compliance certificate from the DENR, which is needed before any construction can start.

Green architect Jun Palafox, who initially denied involvement with the project in September 2021, has since been onboarded with the project, committing to develop it according to "his own vision of Pasig River development". Palafox has also responded to criticism, as he denied that the expressway would only cause additional congestion if built, believing that there is an "unmet demand" for an east-west transportation corridor. Palafox's involvement with the project has also been seen as a complete reversal of his long-standing principles for revitalizing decades of urban decay in Metro Manila with sustainable practices.

Exits

See also
 Pasig River Ferry Service
 Pasig river rehabilitation

References 

Proposed roads in the Philippines
Roads in Metro Manila
Roads in Rizal
Expressway
Toll roads in the Philippines